Doctor Juan Eulogio Estigarribia is a city in the country of Paraguay. It is famous for its Tourism and for its sports which include a local Football Team and several Jet ski lodges, and for its Guarani culture sites. The main River in the city is the Iguazú River and the city is agricultural.

Sources 
World Gazeteer: Paraguay – World-Gazetteer.com

Populated places in the Caaguazú Department